The Leadership Council of Conservative Judaism, also known as the LCCJ, is a council made up of members of the various arms of the Conservative movement, a formal movement within the Jewish denomination of Conservative Judaism.

LCCJ representatives meet twice a year at The Jewish Theological Seminary of America, in New York City, to co-ordinate on issues of movement-wide concern.

One of the first projects approved by the LCCJ was Emet Ve-Emunah: Statement of Principles of Conservative Judaism, published in 1988. For much of the Conservative movement's history, the movement avoided publishing systematic explications of faith.  This was a conscious attempt to hold together a wide coalition. This concern largely became a non-issue after the left-wing of the movement seceded in 1968 to form the Reconstructionist Judaism movement, and after the right-wing seceded in 1985 to form the Union for Traditional Judaism.  In 1988, the nascent LCCJ gave its imprimatur to Emet Ve-Emunah: Statement of Principles of Conservative Judaism. In accord with classical rabbinic Judaism, it agrees that Jews must hold certain beliefs. However, since the Jewish community never developed any one binding catechism, it is impossible to pick out only one person's formal creed and hold it as binding. Instead, Emet Ve-Emunah allows for a range of Jewish beliefs that Conservative rabbis believe are authentically Jewish and justifiable.

Over time the LCCJ came to include all of the following organizations
 Cantors Assembly, Hazzan Steven Stoehr, President
 Federation of Jewish Men’s Clubs, Dr. Robert Braitman, President
 Jewish Educators Assembly, Lonna Picker, President
 Jewish Theological Seminary, Prof. Arnold Eisen, Chancellor
 Masorti Foundation, Gloria Bieler, Earl Greinetz, Co-chairs, Board of Directors
 Masorti Olami, Alan H. Silberman, President
 Mercaz USA, Rabbi Vernon Kurtz, President
 NAASE, Susan Kasper, President
 Rabbinical Assembly, Rabbi Alvin Berkun, President
 National Ramah Commission, Camp Ramah, Morton Steinberg, President
 Schechter Institute of Jewish Studies, Rabbi David Golinkin, President
 Solomon Schechter Day School Association, Andrew Cohen, President
 United Synagogue of Conservative Judaism, Dr. Raymond B. Goldstein, President
 Women’s League for Conservative Judaism, Gloria Cohen, President
 Ziegler School of Rabbinic Studies, Rabbi Bradley Shavit Artson, Dean

LCCJ Statements
[Statement on National Health Care] - 1992
[Statement on Intermarriage] - 1995
[Knesset bill to nullify court ruling on our rabbis] - Attempt by Orthodox Jews to circumvent Israeli High Court rulings on the seating of Conservative and Reform rabbinical nominees to local religious councils.
[Religious Councils Bill in Israel] - 1999 - Attempt to delegitimize Conservative Judaism in [Israel] by Orthodox political parties.
[Statement on 9/11 and Rosh HaShanah] - 2001
[Not accepting Conservative conversions in Israel] - 2002 Statement on attempts by Orthodox Jews and the then Interior Minister of [Israel] to violate Israeli law, and not allow Conservative converts to Judaism to be accepted as Jews.
[Statement on Israel Self-Defense and Peace] - 2006

External links
 LCCJ Conservative Judaism website
 Leadership Council of Conservative Judaism ConJ article

Conservative Judaism
Governing assemblies of religious organizations